Mauro Ezequiel Lombardo (born 24 June 1996), known professionally as Duki, is an Argentine rapper and singer. He is the lead voice of Latin trap in Argentina, thanks to his multiple hits with his singles and his particular style of voice and staging.

Duki began to gain recognition for his appearances in rap battles, such as El Quinto Escalón, which was one of the most important in Argentina, and where he obtained his first share of popularity when he won it in 2016. Thanks to his victory, he was able to record his first single "No Vendo Trap" to pursue a musical career. He then released the singles "She Don't Give a Fo" and "Hello Cotto" which garnered him multiple views on YouTube and earned Lombardo a massive following in his home country. In 2018 he formed an important musical trio for Argentine trap, named Modo Diablo, with artists YSY A and Neo Pistea. He then released his debut studio album, Súper Sangre Joven (2019), with the lead single "Goteo" being nominated for Best Rap/Hip Hop Song at the 21st Latin Grammy Awards. In 2020 he collaborated in Bad Bunny's album YHLQMDLG in the single "Hablamos Mañana", which was also nominated in the Latin Grammys for Best Urban Fusion/Performance. In 2021 Duki released his second album, Desde el Fin del Mundo, which reached number one in digital albums in Argentina.

Early life 
Mauro Ezequiel Lombardo was born on 24 June 1996, in Almagro, Buenos Aires. Son of lawyer Sandra Viviana Quiroga and graphic designer Guillermo Luis Lombardo, he has two siblings, Nahuel, a sound engineer, and Candela. Raised in La Paternal, he had a strong musical influence thanks to his parents, who listened to Argentine rock, salsa, disco and Latin pop. His mother was a follower of artist Alejandro Sanz, and his father was a fan of bands Queen and Virus. On the other side, his brother Nahuel was a fan of Charly García and Luis Alberto Spinetta. During his early teens, Lombardo started to gain interest in punk rock, being a strong listener of Linkin Park, and hip hop, thanks to Eminem and 50 Cent, which lead him to eventually start watching rap battles, which had an important underground following in Argentina.

Influenced by long-time Argentine rappers Kódigo and Tata, he start practicising freestyle with his best friends, which allowed him to gain confidence to start participating in battle competitions. Alongside this, he dropped high school due to his poor grades.

Career

2013-2016: Early years and success in rap battles 
Duki participated in his first rap battle in 2013, in which he became victorious. He described it years later as "catastrophic, it was raining, but we ended up wining". During this time, he formed a rap crew called Atuanorinos Tripulación, and participated in a lot of famous underground rap competitions, such as Las Vegas Freestyle or Madero Free.

Around 2015, he appeared for the first time in El Quinto Escalón, a competition which was celebrated in Parque Rivadavia, a very centric park in Buenos Aires. This allowed the competition to become recognized very quickly, with a lot of young rappers starting to rise to a massive following, such as Paulo Londra, Lit Killah, or Trueno. Duki became one of the most praised and recognized MC's due to his flow and strong staging. In 2016 he won it for the first time, beating rapper Nacho in the final. The prize was a session in a music studio to record a single. This made Duki record his first single, "No Vendo Trap", in November 2016. The official video was uploaded on YouTube, and it gained two million views in just two weeks. Due to the success of the song, the producer of the sample Pa$ha decided to strike the video for copyright, and the platform took the video down. This did not stop Duki from recording more singles that led him to gain a massive fan base, mostly coming from his battle days.

2017-2018: First breakthrough singles and Modo Diablo 
In late 2016 and early 2017 Duki continued to appear in El Quinto Escalón, now one of the most important competitions in Argentina and South America. Several of Duki's battles, along with his partner MKS, gained many views on YouTube, some of them becoming the most viewed battles in Spanish in history. Thanks to his increasing fame, Duki was signed to Mueva Records, and released the singles "She Don't Give a Fo" and "Hello Cotto" with producer Omar Varela to launch his music career. The first one was certified gold by Spain's PROMUSICAE, and both singles suprassed a 100 million views on YouTube, establishing Duki as one of the most promising trap artists in Argentina. Two weeks later, he participated in Khea's single "Loca", with rappers Cazzu and Bad Bunny, which ranked 45 in the Hot Latin Songs chart and went gold by the RIAA.

During 2018 Duki formed a trap trio with YSY A, the host of El Quinto Escalón, and Neo Pistea, another promising trap artist in Argentina. The trio published the singles "Quavo" and "Trap N' Export", gaining a lot of views in YouTube. In March they performed in the Teatro Gran Rex, which was sold out. During May, Duki performed his single "Rockstar" with a live orchestra at the Premios Gardel, a performance that received a harsh critical reception, with artist Charly Garcia saying during his acceptance speech that "autotune should be banned". However, Duki didn't mind Garcia's criticism, stating that "he could say I'm a scumbag and I'd be happy anyway. I love him, I went to one of his concerts when I was younger. I respect him so much that I didn't even respond to him."

During this year, Duki continued to release singles to reach further popularity. His singles "Si Te Sentís Sola" and "Hijo de la Noche" reached the top-10 of the Argentine rankings. However, during this time, Duki began to have anxiety attacks, and started a drug dependency, while living in a residence called La Mansión with the other members of Modo Diablo. Duki decided to leave the house, and was helped by his family to recover. At the end of the year, Lombardo refused to sign with Sony and Universal, and was part of the jury of the Red Bull Batalla de Gallos contest, held in Argentina and won by fellow rapper Wos. He was also the cover of Rolling Stone Argentina. In December 2018 he released the single "Sin Culpa" with singer DrefQuila, that peaked at the sixth position of the Billboard Argentina Hot 100, the highest position reached so far by Lombardo.

2019: "Goteo" and first studio album 

During the summer of 2019, Modo Diablo split due to the artists wanting to launch solo careers. In February Duki participated in the first Argentine trap festival, Buenos Aires Trap, which featured appearances by Bad Bunny, Cazzu and Khea. In March, Duki was part of the mega-collaboration in the Neo Pistea's remix single "Tumbando el Club", which peaked at number 3 in Argentina Hot 100. In June, he made the official soundtrack of the third season of series El marginal, with artist Vicentico.

On 6 August, Duki released the single "Goteo", which reached the 10th position in the Argentine Hot 100, remaining for three months in the chart. It also reached the top-10 in Spain, with Duki touring there and selling out every show. The tour video was later part of the official video for "Goteo". This song would end up being part of Duki's debut studio album, Súper Sangre Joven, with other tracks such as "Hitboy" (with Khea), "Te Traje Flores" and "A Punta de Espada" reaching into the Argentina Hot 100 chart. The album featured guests appearances from Khea, C. Tangana, Alemán, YSY A, Marcianos Crew, Eladio Carrión and Sfera Ebbasta, and received mixed reviews from critics, some praising Duki's versatility (the album featured various genres such as tango, R&B and rock) but others criticizing the album's forced composition.

In September, Duki toured the United States, with two shows in Wisconsin and New York, which had a "poor performance", said by Duki. He stated, "I performed poorly, no one knew me and I felt depressed. I insulted my crew on stage". It was at this point that Duki realized he needed to professionalize his career, so he hired family members to form a team. He also created his own record label, SSJ Records. During the end of 2019, Duki was part of three of the ten most listened songs in Argentina by Billboard during 2019.  In November he returned to Buenos Aires Trap, and insinuated at retiring from music on his Twitter account, criticizing the music industry.

2020-act: Musical maturity and Desde el Fin del Mundo 
In 2020 Duki announced that he would focus on release more produced songs and less singles. At the beginning of the year he participated in the Bad Bunny album YHLQMDLG in the track "Hablamos Mañana", that earned a nomination for Best Urban Fusion/Performance in the 21st Latin Grammys. On 24 June, he released an EP named 24 to celebrate his birthday, which contained eight songs, and featured the stellar participation of U.S. rapper Juicy J. During October, he released a series of interviews in YouTube called Fideos con Duko, in which Duki interviewed several artists from Argentina, and his mother as a special for Mother's Day in Argentina. During late 2020 Duki announced that he would travel to United States to start recording his next album, set to be released in April 2021.

In January 2021, Duki released the first single from his upcoming album, titled "Muero de Fiesta este Finde", with Ca7riel. On 15 February, Duki tweeted that the album would have 18 songs. On 4 March, he participated in Rusherking and Tiago PZK's single "Además de Mí", which peaked at number one on Argentina Hot 100 chart. In 16 March Duki released the second and lead single from his next album, titled "Chico Estrella", which reached number 31 on the Argentine Hot 100. On 1 April, Duki was featured on Khea's single "Wacha", which reached number three on Argentina Hot 100, the third time the duo has entered the chart. During this month, Duki starred in a series of collaborations with the NBA on YouTube.

Desde el Fin del Mundo was released on 22 April, produced on his most part by producers Asan and Yesan. The album featured a long guest list of South American artists, with Duki stating that the concept of the album was to showcase the quality of the artists from the region. Along with trap, the album experiments with genres such as electro dance, drill and punk rock. It was better received than its predecessor, with reviews praising Duki's maturation and versatility, but with others noting songs that felt a bit out of place. The album entered Spotify's Global Album Debuts chart at number three. The following week, Duki released on YouTube a concept album with visuals of the album's 18 songs, in which Duki is seen dancing and singing the album's songs in a room with all the collaborators. The tracks "Malbec", "Cascada" and "Pintao" entered in the Argentina Hot 100 chart. In May, he performed a show in El Calafate, with the Perito Moreno Glacier as a background.

After his album Desde el Fin del Mundo, he announced that he would start singing reggaeton with a group of songs called Temporada de Reggaeton. He released its album on 25 November 2021 and got to the top 3 in the Top 10 Global Album Debuts of Spotify.

He also announced his return to Latin trap on 20 July 2022, with the release of his long-awaited single "Givenchy", where he also announced his new project Temporada de Diablos.

Discography 

 Súper Sangre Joven (2019)
 Desde el Fin del Mundo (2021)

Awards and nominations

Personal life 
Duki is a huge fan of the League of Legends video game, he has said that he could spend hours playing. Duki is also a basketball fan. He has also revealed that he liked soccer, his favorite team was the Club Atlético Independiente. He had a romantic relationship with Lola Magnin that lasted from 2016 to 2018. In 2020 it was confirmed that Duki had a romantic relationship with the Argentine singer and actress Brenda Asnicar but their relationship ended in 2021. Since 2021 he has been in a romantic relationship with the Argentine singer Emilia Mernes.

References

External links 
 
 
 
 
 

Argentine rappers
Argentine people of Italian descent
Argentine trap musicians
Argentine reggaeton musicians
Latin trap musicians
Reggaeton musicians
1996 births
Living people
People from Buenos Aires
Latin music songwriters